The 1968 Australia rugby union tour of British Isles  was a short series of two matches played by the Australia national rugby union team in October–November 1968.
The "Wallabies " lost both matches against Ireland and Scotland

The Matches 
Scores and results list Australia's points tally first.

References

 

1968
1968
1968
1968–69 in Irish rugby union
1968 in Australian rugby union
1968–69 in Scottish rugby union
1968–69 in European rugby union
1968–69 in British rugby union
1968